Rodea may refer to:

 Rodea, protagonist of 2015 video game Rodea the Sky Soldier
 Eugenio López Rodea (1934–2022), founder of the beverage company Jumex
 Rodea, a tributary of Pamplonita River, in Norte de Santander, Colombia

See also
 
 Peragrarchis rodea, a species of moth